is a 2022 Japanese ONA series releasing on YouTube and Pokémon TV by The Pokémon Company.

Pokémon: Hisuian Snow is a series of 3 episodes, inspired by Hisui region of the Pokémon world. The first episode was released on May 18, 2022.

The Hisui region was originally explored in the Pokémon Legends: Arceus video game and represents the Sinnoh region of old before the existence of Pokémon Trainers and Pokémon Leagues. Pokémon: Hisuian Snow is a story that takes place during this ancient age when the relationship between people and Pokémon was very different. Aboard a boat bound for the Hisui region, the protagonist Alec reminisces about the first time his father took him there. Over the span of three episodes, Pokémon: Hisuian Snow goes into detail about Alec's stories from the past.

Episode list

Characters and voice cast

See also 
 Other Pokémon animated series:
 Pokémon Origins
 Pokémon Generations
 Pokémon: Twilight Wings
 Pokémon Evolutions
 Pokétoon

External links  
 Official Pokémon Japanese, US and UK links

References 

2022 anime ONAs
Anime television series based on video games
Wit Studio
Pokémon anime
YouTube original programming
YouTube Premium original series